Matthew John McGrath (December 28, 1875 – January 29, 1941) was a member of the Irish American Athletic Club, the New York Athletic Club, and the New York City Police Department. At the time of his death at age 64, he attained the rank of Police Inspector, and during his career received the NYPD's Medal of Valor twice. He competed for the U.S. team in the Olympics in 1908, 1912, 1920 and 1924 (at age 47). In his prime, he was known as "one of the world's greatest weight throwers."

Life

McGrath was born on 28 December 1875 in Curraghmore, near Nenagh, County Tipperary, Ireland, to Tim McGrath, a farmer, and Anne McGrath. He later immigrated to the United States. During his competitive years he stood 5′ 11½″ (1.82 m) tall and weighed 247 lb (112 kg), and was part of a group of large and dominant throwers referred to as the Irish Whales.

He did not achieve success in the hammer throw until age 27, when he ranked seventh on the world list of best marks.  He remained in the world's top ten up to the age of 50, making his career one of the longest and most consistent in the history of the sport.  He won seven AAU hammer throw championships, won seven more in the little-contested 56-pound weight throw, and set two hammer throw world records.  His lifetime best throw was the second of those records, 187′ 4″ (57.10 m), made at New York City’s Celtic Park on October 29, 1911.

McGrath made his Olympic debut in 1908.  He entered the Olympics as the (unofficial) world record holder and took second behind John Flanagan's third consecutive victory.  In 1912 McGrath won the Olympic title in dominating fashion (the shortest of his six throws was over 15 feet (4.5 m) longer than any other competitor's best throw) and set an Olympic record that stood for 24 years.

At the 1920 Olympics McGrath was a co-favorite along with fellow Irish American Athletic Club member Patrick Ryan, but finished fifth after injuring his knee during the competition.  In 1924 he again won the silver medal and is the oldest American track and field medalist ever.  An off day at the 1928 Final Olympic try-outs barely kept him off the 1928 Olympic team.  There was a public outcry over McGrath's omission from the team and although he went to Amsterdam after a subscription fund had been raised to pay for his transportation, he was, not surprisingly, not allowed to compete.

Held ages 35, 40, 45, 50 and 55 American Records in the Hammer Throw (today refereed to as Masters Records). In 2002, three statues honoring Olympic champions with links to Nenagh, Matt McGrath, Johnny Hayes and Bob Tisdall, were unveiled in front of the Nenagh Courthouse.

Notes

References
Buchanan, Ian and Mallon, Bill (1984). Quest For Gold: The Encyclopedia of American Olympians.  Leisure Press
 

 
Hymans, Richard (1996) The United States Olympic Trials for Track and Field, 1908–1992.  Indianapolis, IN: USA Track & Field.
Quercetani, Roberto L. (2000)  Athletics: A History of Modern Track and Field Athletics.  Milan, Italy: SEP Editrice srl. 
Wallechinsky, David (2000) The Complete Book of the Summer Olympics, Sydney 2000 edition.  Woodstock, NY: The Overlook Press.

External links

Inspector Matthew J. McGrath: "The Prince of Whales"

 Irish-born Medal Winners in the early Olympic Games
Olympic biography and photos

Winged Fist Organization

1941 deaths
American male hammer throwers
Irish male hammer throwers
Irish emigrants to the United States (before 1923)
Athletes (track and field) at the 1908 Summer Olympics
Athletes (track and field) at the 1912 Summer Olympics
Athletes (track and field) at the 1920 Summer Olympics
Athletes (track and field) at the 1924 Summer Olympics
New York City Police Department officers
Olympic gold medalists for the United States in track and field
Olympic silver medalists for the United States in track and field
Tug of war competitors at the 1908 Summer Olympics
1875 births
Sportspeople from County Tipperary
People from Nenagh
Male weight throwers
Medalists at the 1924 Summer Olympics
Medalists at the 1912 Summer Olympics
Medalists at the 1908 Summer Olympics
Track and field athletes from New York City